Commercial animal cloning is the cloning of animals for commercial purposes, currently, including livestock, competition camels and horses, pets, medical uses, endangered and extinct animals, as first demonstrated in 1996 for Dolly the sheep.

Cloning methods
Moving or copying all (or nearly all) genes from one animal to form a second, genetically nearly identical, animal is usually done through one of three methods: the Roslin technique, the Honolulu technique, and Artificial Twinning.  The first two of these involve a process known as somatic cell nuclear transfer. In this process, an oocyte is taken from a surrogate mother and put through enucleation, a process that removes the nucleus from inside the oocyte. Somatic cells are then taken from the animal that is being cloned, transferred into the blank oocyte in order to provide genetic material, and fused with the oocyte using an electrical current. The oocyte is then activated and re-inserted into the surrogate mother. The end result is the formation of an animal that is almost genetically identical to the animal the somatic cells were taken from. While somatic cell nuclear transfer was previously believed to only work using genetic material from somatic cells that were unfrozen or were frozen with cryoprotectant (to avoid cell damage caused by freezing), successful dog cloning in various breeds has now been shown using somatic cells from unprotected specimens that had been frozen for up to four days. Another method of cloning includes embryo splitting, the process of taking the blastomeres from a very early animal embryo and separating them before they become differentiated in order to create two or more separate organisms. When using embryo splitting, cloning must occur before the birth of the animal, and clones grow up at the same time (in a similar fashion to monozygotic twins).

Livestock cloning
The US Food and Drug Administration has concluded that "Food from cattle, swine, and goat clones is as safe to eat as food from any other cattle, swine, or goat."  It has also noted that "The main use of agricultural clones is to produce breeding stock, not food. Clones allow farmers to upgrade the overall quality of their herds by providing more copies of the best animals in the herd. These animals are then used for conventional breeding, and the sexually reproduced offspring become the food producing animals." Regardless, a large (million cloned cattle per year) Tianjin animal cloning center was proposed in 2015 "to be put into use in the first half of 2016",, but as of 2022, no opening had been reported. The goals of cloning listed by the FDA include "disease resistance ... suitability to climate ... quality body type .. fertility ... and market preference (leanness, tenderness, color, size of various cuts, etc.") Milk productivity is another desirable trait that cloning is used for, including in the case of cloned "supercows".

Competition horses and camels
Polo horses and camels are being cloned for competition use. Horse cloning is often referred to as "equine cloning". In 2012, Féderation Equestre Internationale (FEI) lifted a ban on horse cloning, allowing them to compete.

Medical uses
Organs from cloned pigs are beginning to be transplanted into human patients. (See Xenotransplantation)

Cancer-sniffing dogs have also been cloned. A review concluded that "qualified elite working dogs can be produced by cloning a working dog that exhibits both an appropriate temperament and good health."

Other working animals with high performance

Cloning of super sniffer dogs for airports was reported in 2011, four years afterwards when the dogs started working. Cloning of a successful rescue dog was reported in 2009 and of a police dog in 2019.

Endangered and extinct animals

The only extinct animal to be cloned as of 2022 is a Pyrenean ibex, born on July 30, 2003, in Spain, which died minutes later due to physical defects in the lungs.

Endangered animals, to add genetic diversity to inbred species, are also being cloned in certain centers, notably ViaGen, aided by the  San Diego Frozen Zoo, and Revive & Restore.  This is also referred to as "conservation cloning".  Two examples are the black-footed ferret and Przewalski’s horse.

In a recent study using sturgeons (species of fish in the Acipenseridae family), scientists have been making improvements to a technique called somatic nuclear cell transfer with the ultimate goal being to save endangered species. Sturgeons are endangered due to the high levels of poaching, increased destruction to habitats, water pollution, and overfishing. This makes this species a perfect candidate for improving this type of cloning method, in hopes of preserving natural populations from becoming endangered. The somatic nuclear cell transfer technique is a well-known cloning method that has been used for years but focuses on species that are thriving rather than those endangered or extinct animals. This technique usually uses a single somatic donor cell with a single manipulation and inserts it into a recipient egg of the species of interest. It has recently been found that the position by which that somatic cell is located inside the recipient is very important in order to successfully clone a species. By making adjustments to the original method of using a single somatic cell and instead use multiple somatic donor cells to insert into the recipient egg, the likeliness of the somatic donor cells being in the crucial position on the egg will increase tremendously. This increase will then result in higher success rates with cloning. There is still ongoing research using this improved method happening but from the data collected thus far, it seems to be a reasonable method to continue and soon be able to help stop species like the sturgeons from becoming endangered and possibly stop extinction from occurring.

When it comes to the cloning of extinct animals, things become quite difficult because when death occurs, the animal's DNA starts to decay. This makes it impossible to fully preserve the entire genome by known cloning methods. New studies using genome editing, have made it possible to bring back traits of the extinct species. Currently, a lab at Harvard University's Wyss Institute, is working on a way to bring back a famously known extinct species referred to as the mammoth (or at least incorporate its traits into a closely related species). The goal is to genetically modify the mammoth's closely related living species, the elephant, in hopes of expanding available habitats of elephants and connecting lost ecological interactions. In order to make this goal possible, the team must first sequence and assemble the mammoth genome from preserved remains. After identifying the genome sequencing, a comparison of the extinct species and its closest living relative's genome can be made using advanced genome editing technology.

Studies have shown "cloning" of extinct animals is impossible, unlike currently living animals. As a closely related alternative, genome engineering seems to be the next best thing in making these long-gone species somewhat present in today's time. Methods like CRISPR/caps9 allow scientists to edit the genome of closely related relatives, allowing at least the traits of extinct animals to become present, which is essentially like bringing the extinct species back itself.

History and commercialization
ViaGen began by offering cloning to the livestock and equine industry in 2003, and later as ViaGen Pets included cloning of cats and dogs in 2016. ViaGen's subsidiary, stART Licensing, owns a cloning patent which is licensed to their only competitor as of 2018, who also offers animal cloning services. (Viagen is a subsidiary of Precigen.)

The first commercially cloned pet was a cat named Little Nicky, produced in 2004 by Genetic Savings & Clone for a north Texas woman for the fee of US$50,000.  On May 21, 2008, BioArts International announced a limited commercial dog cloning service (through a program it called Best Friends Again) in partnership with a Korean company named  Sooam Biotech.  This program came after the announcement of the successful cloning of a family dog named Missy, an achievement widely publicized in the Missyplicity Project. In September 2009, BioArts announced the end of its dog cloning service. In July 2008, the Seoul National University (co-parents of Snuppy, reputedly the world's first cloned dog in 2005) created five clones of a dog named Booger for its Californian owner. The woman paid $50,000 for this service.

Sooam Biotech continued developing proprietary techniques for cloning dogs based on a licence from ViaGen's subsidiary, stART Licensing (which owned the original patent for the process of animal cloning.). (Although the animal itself is not patentable, the process is protected by a patent). Sooam created cloned puppies for owners whose dogs had died, charging $100,000 per clone. Sooam Biotech was reported to have cloned approximately 700 dogs by 2015 and to be producing 500 cloned embryos of various breeds a day in 2016. In 2015, the longest period after which Sooam Biotech could clone a puppy was 12 days from the death of the original pet dog.
Sinogene Biotechnology created the first Chinese clone dog in 2017 before commercializing the cloning service and joining in the pet cloning market. In 2019, Sinogene successfully created the first Chinese cloned cat.

Controversies

Animal welfare
The mortality rate for cloned animals is higher than for those born of natural processes. This includes a discrepancy pre-birth, during birth, and after birth in survival rates and quality of life, leading to ethical concerns. Many of these discrepancies are thought to come from maternal mRNA already present in the oocyte prior to the transfer of genetic material as well as from DNA methylation, both of which contribute to the development of the animal in the womb of the surrogate. Some common issues seen with cloned animals are shortened telomeres, the repetitive end sequences of DNA whose decreasing length over the lifespan of an organism have been associated with aging; large offspring syndrome, the abnormal size of cloned individuals due to epigenetic (gene expression) changes; and methylation patterns of genetic material that are so abnormal compared to standard embryos of the species being cloned as to be incompatible with life.

Pet cloning
While pet cloning is sometimes advertised as a prospective method for re-gaining a deceased companionship animal, pet cloning does not result in animals that are exactly like the previous pet (in looks or personality). Although the animal in question is cloned, there are still phenotypical differences that may affect its appearance or health. This issue was brought to light in the cloning of a cat named Rainbow. Rainbow's clone, later named CC, was genetically identical to Rainbow, yet CC's coloring patterns were not the same due to the development of the kitten inside the womb as well as random genetic disparities in the clone such as variable X-chromosome inactivation.

Despite its controversies, the study of pet cloning holds the potential to contribute to scientific, veterinary, and medical knowledge, and it is a potential resource in efforts to preserve endangered cousins of the cat and dog.

In 2005, California Assembly Member Lloyd Levine introduced a bill to ban the sale or transfer of pet clones in California. That bill was voted down.

See also
 Biobank
 Cultivar: term used in botany to refer to specific breeds (made using selective cross breeding and sometimes genetic modification) that have distinct properties. Often reproduced using cloning to avoid properties being lost due to sexual propagation.
 List of animals that have been cloned
 Working animal

References

Pets
Cloning